Chrast or Chrást may refer to places in the Czech Republic:

Chrast, a town in the Pardubice Region
Chrást (Nymburk District), a municipality and village in the Central Bohemian Region
Chrást (Plzeň-City District), a municipality and village in the Plzeň Region
Chrást (Příbram District), a municipality and village in the Central Bohemian Region
Chrast, a village and part of Dolní Krupá (Havlíčkův Brod District) in the Vysočina Region
Chrást, a village and part of Kovářov in the South Bohemian Region
Chrást, a village and part of Křesetice in the Central Bohemian Region
Chrást, a village and part of Mladá Boleslav in the Central Bohemian Region
Chrást, a village and part of Pivkovice in the South Bohemian Region
Chrást, a village and part of Tišice in the Central Bohemian Region
Chrást, a village and part of Týnec nad Sázavou in the Central Bohemian Region

See also
Chrasť nad Hornádom, a municipality and village in the Košice Region